Chishmy (Şişmä) is a rural locality (a village) in Urshakbashkaramalinsky Selsoviet, Miyakinsky District, Bashkortostan, Russia. The population was 25 as of 2010. There is 1 street.

Geography 
Chishmy is located 42 km east of Kirgiz-Miyaki (the district's administrative centre) by road. Aitovo is the nearest rural locality.

References 

Rural localities in Miyakinsky District